Sar Khoshki (also Romanized as Sar Khoshkī; also known as Khoshk, Khoshkī, Khūshg, and Khushki) is a village in Hajji Bekandeh-ye Koshk-e Bijar Rural District, Khoshk-e Bijar District, Rasht County, Gilan Province, Iran. At the 2006 census, its population was 857, in 233 families.

References 

Populated places in Rasht County